Evelyn Preer (née Jarvis; July 26, 1896 – November 17, 1932), was a pioneering American stage and screen actress and jazz and blues singer of the 1910s through the early 1930s. Preer was known within the black community as "The First Lady of the Screen."

She was the first black actress to earn celebrity and popularity.  She appeared in ground-breaking films and stage productions, such as the first play by a black playwright to be produced on Broadway, and the first New York-style production with a black cast in California in 1928, in a revival of a play adapted from Somerset Maugham's Rain.

Early life 
 
Evelyn Jarvis was born in Vicksburg, Mississippi on July 26, 1896.  After her father, Frank, died prematurely, she moved with her mother, Blanche, and her three other siblings to Chicago, Illinois.  She completed grammar school and high school in Chicago.  Her early experiences in vaudeville and "street preaching" with her mother are what jump-started her acting career.

Career in cinema 
At the age of 23, Preer's first film role was in Oscar Micheaux's 1919 debut film The Homesteader, in which she played Orlean. Preer was promoted by Micheaux as his leading actress with a steady tour of personal appearances and a publicity campaign, she was one of the first African American women to become a star to the black community. She also acted in Micheaux's Within Our Gates (1920), in which she plays Sylvia Landry, a teacher who needs to raise money to save her school.

She continued her career by starring in 19 films. Micheaux developed many of his subsequent films to showcase Preer's versatility. These included The Brute (1920), The Gunsaulus Mystery (1921), Deceit (1923), Birthright (1924), The Devil’s Disciple (1926), The Conjure Woman (1926) and The Spider's Web (1926). Preer had her talkie debut in the race musical Georgia Rose (1930). In 1931, she performed with Sylvia Sidney in the film Ladies of the Big House. Her final film performance was as Lola, a prostitute, in Josef von Sternberg's 1932 film Blonde Venus, with Cary Grant and Marlene Dietrich. Preer was lauded by both the black and white press for her ability to continually succeed in ever more challenging roles, "...her roles ran the gamut from villain to heroine an attribute that many black actresses who worked in Hollywood cinema history did not have the privilege or luxury to enjoy."  Only her film by Micheaux and three shorts survive. She was known for refusing to play roles that she believed demeaned African Americans.

Career in theatre 
In 1920, Preer joined The Lafayette Players a theatrical stock company in Chicago that was founded in 1915 by Anita Bush, a pioneering stage and film actress known as “The Little Mother of Black Drama". Bush and her troupe toured the US to bring legitimate theatre to black audiences at a time when theatres were racially segregated by law in the South, and often by custom in the North and the interest of vaudeville was fading. The Lafayette Players brought drama to black audiences, which caused it to flourish until its end during the Great Depression.

By the mid-1920s, Preer began garnering attention from the white press, and she began to appear in crossover films and stage parts. In 1923, she acted in the Ethiopian Art Theatre's production of The Chip Woman's Fortune by Willis Richardson. This was the first dramatic play by an African-American playwright to be produced on Broadway, and it lasted two weeks. In 1926, Preer appeared on Broadway in David Belasco’s production of Lulu Belle. Preer supported and understudied Lenore Ulric in the leading role of Edward Sheldon's drama of a Harlem prostitute. She garnered acclaim in Sadie Thompson in a West Coast revival of Somerset Maugham’s play about a fallen woman.

She rejoined the Lafayette Players for that production in their first show in Los Angeles at the Lincoln Center. Under the leadership of Robert Levy, Preer and her colleagues performed in the first New York-style play featuring black players to be produced in California. That year, she also appeared in Rain, a play adapted from Maugham's short story by the same name.

Preer also sang in cabaret and musical theater where she was occasionally backed by such diverse musicians as Duke Ellington and Red Nichols early in their careers. Preer was regarded by many as the greatest actress of her time.

Marriage and family
Preer married Frank Preer on January 16, 1915, in Chicago. She met her second husband, Edward Thompson, when they were both acting with the Lafayette Players in Chicago. They married February 4, 1924, in Williamson County, Tennessee. Some sources indicate Preer was married to Lawrence Chenault.

In April 1932, Preer gave birth to her only child, daughter Edeve Thompson.

Death
Developing post-childbirth complications, Preer died of double pneumonia on November 27, 1932, in Los Angeles at the age of 36. Her husband continued as a popular leading man and "heavy" in numerous race films throughout the 1930s and 1940s, and died in 1960. 

Their daughter Edeve Thompson converted to Catholicism as a teenager. She later entered the Sisters of St. Francis of Oldenburg, Indiana, where she became known as Sister Francesca Thompson, O.S.F., and became an academic, teaching at both Marian University in Indiana and Fordham University in New York City.

Filmography

 The Homesteader (1919)
 Within Our Gates (1920)
 The Brute (1920)
 The Gunsaulus Mystery (1921)
 Deceit (1923)
 Birthright (1924)
 The Devil's Disciple (1926)
 The Conjure Woman (1926)
 The Spider's Web (1926)
 The Framing of the Shrew (1928)
 Melancholy Dame (1928)
 Oft in the Silly Night (1928)
 The Lady Fare (1929) 
 Brown Gravy (1929) 
 The Widow's Bite (1929) 
 Georgia Rose (1930)
 The Good Sport (1931) uncredited 
 Ladies of the Big House (1931)
 Blonde Venus (1932)

Theater 
 Rang Tang (1927)

Further reading
 Bowser, Pearl. Oscar Micheaux, His Silent Films and His Circle: African-American Filmmaking and Race Cinema of the Silent Era, Bloomington, Indiana.: Indiana University Press, 2001, pp. 19–33
 Cripps, Thomas. Slow Fade to Black: The Negro in American Film, 1900-1942, New York, New York: Oxford University Press, 1977, pp. 324–25.

References

External links

 Evelyn Preer- Our First Lady of the Silver Screen

1896 births
1932 deaths
20th-century American actresses
Actresses from Mississippi
African-American actresses
American blues singers
American film actresses
American silent film actresses
American stage actresses
Blackface minstrel performers
Musicians from Vicksburg, Mississippi
Vaudeville performers
Deaths from pneumonia in California
20th-century American singers
20th-century American women singers
20th-century African-American women singers